N61, or rijksweg 61, is a freeway in the province of Zeeland in the Netherlands.

Motorways in the Netherlands
Motorways in Zeeland
Sluis
Terneuzen